Marie Tudor is an 1833 play by the French writer Victor Hugo. It is a historical work portraying the rise, fall and execution of Fabiano Fabiani, a fictional favourite of Mary I of England (1516–1558). Mary has Fabiani thrown in the Tower of London and despite later wishing to spare his life, is unable to do so. This was an influence on Oscar Wilde's later The Duchess of Padua.

Adaptations
The play was adapted into an opera at least twice. J. V. Bridgeman adapted it in English for Balfe's The Armourer of Nantes (1863). Emilio Praga adapted it in Italian for Maria Tudor (1879) composed by Antônio Carlos Gomes.

The play has also been made into films. In 1912 Albert Capellani directed Marie Tudor, a silent film version of the play. A 1966 French television film Marie Tudor was also made, directed by Abel Gance. A 1911 Italian film, Mary Tudor, might also have been based on the play.

References

External links
Collection which includes English translation of Marie Tudor

Bibliography
 Kohl, Norbert. Oscar Wilde: The Works of a Conformist Rebel. Cambridge University Press, 2011.
 Parrill, Sue & Robison, William B. The Tudors on Film and Television. McFarland, 2013.

1833 plays
Plays set in England
Plays set in the 16th century
Plays by Victor Hugo
French plays adapted into films
Plays adapted into operas
Cultural depictions of Mary I of England
Plays about English royalty
Tudor England in popular culture